The 1995 Colonial Athletic Association baseball tournament was held at Grainger Stadium in Kinston, North Carolina, from May 17 through 21.  The event determined the champion of the Colonial Athletic Association for the 1995 season.  Defending champion and fifth-seeded  won the tournament for the second time and earned the CAA's automatic bid to the 1995 NCAA Division I baseball tournament.

Entering the event, East Carolina had won the most championships, with five.  George Mason had won two, while Richmond and Old Dominion had each won once.

Format and seeding
The CAA's seven teams were seeded one to seven based on winning percentage from the conference's round robin regular season.  They played a double-elimination tournament.

Bracket and results

Most Valuable Player
Maika Symmonds was named Tournament Most Valuable Player.  Symmonds was an outfielder and pitcher for Old Dominion.

References

Tournament
Colonial Athletic Association Baseball Tournament
Colonial Athletic Association baseball tournament
Colonial Athletic Association baseball tournament
Baseball in North Carolina
College sports in North Carolina
Sports competitions in North Carolina
Tourist attractions in Lenoir County, North Carolina